Wildcat Mountain, with an elevation of 3,760 feet, has the distinction of being the highest peak in White County,  Georgia, United States but not the highest point in the county. The boundary line between White County and Towns County bisects Tray Mountain, but leaves the summit of the mountain in Towns County.  Thus, the upper elevations of Tray Mountain falling within White County at nearly  rob the summit of Wildcat Mountain of the title "highest point in White County."  Wildcat Mountain is within the borders of the Chattahoochee National Forest.

References

External links 

 Topographical map of Tray Mountain

Mountains of Georgia (U.S. state)
Mountains of White County, Georgia
Chattahoochee-Oconee National Forest